The garden dormouse (Eliomys quercinus) is a species of dormouse native to Europe.

Characteristics

The garden dormouse is gray or brown, with a whitish underside. It has black eye markings and large ears. Its hair is short, and its tail has a white tassel at the end. It weighs .

Distribution and habitat

In spite of its name, the garden dormouse's main habitat is the forest, though it can also be found in fruit-growing regions. It is particularly common in southern Europe, but its range extends into the north. Garden dormice are often found in the Alps, the Bavarian Forest, and the Ore Mountains.

The species is also present in northern Germany, but that population is apparently not capable of large-scale reproduction. In the Netherlands, it is almost extirpated: in 2007, researchers reported finding only nine animals in two woods in the province of Limburg, where it used to be common. They suggested this is a result of the landscape becoming increasingly monotonous and due to climate change, which they said interrupts hibernation.

To draw attention to the limits of the adaptability, the Swiss nature conservation organisation Pro Natura has named the garden dormouse "Animal of the Year" in 2022. The same year, using camera traps and Spurentunnel (a tunnel-like device that forces animals to step into an ink container, and leave footprints), the first recorded sightings of garden dormice in more than 100 years were made in Büsserach.

Behaviour and ecology

The garden dormouse is primarily nocturnal, sleeping in nests in trees during the day, with sometimes multiple individuals living in one nest. Garden dormice are omnivorous, seasonally consuming both small animals, typically arthropods such as insects and millpedes, snails, and plant matter, usually fruit and seeds. Garden dormice are amongst the most carnivorous of all dormice and have been known to consume adult birds, reptiles, amphibians and small mammals, some of which is likely scavenged. Cannibalism has also been reported.

The mating period lasts from April to June. During this time, the female indicates her readiness to mate by squeaking loudly. The young are usually born in litters of three to seven, after a gestation period of 23 days. Blind and naked at birth, they open their eyes after about 18 days, and are nursed until they are one month old. They become independent at two months of age, but do not reach sexual maturity until the next year. They have a life expectancy of about five years.

The garden dormouse is a host of the Acanthocephalan intestinal parasite Moniliformis siciliensis in Sicily.

Classification
On the islands of the Mediterranean Sea, all of the several subspecies of garden dormouse are very rare. These are the Sardinian garden dormouse (E. q. sardus), the Sicilian garden dormouse (E. q. dichrurus), the Liparian garden dormouse (E. q. liparensis), the Balearic garden dormouse (E. q. gymnesicus) and the Formentera Island garden dormouse (E. q. ophiusae), which is notable for its larger size and all-black tail. The populations of western Asia and north Africa, on the other hand, have recently been separated into their own species, Eliomys melanurus.

References

This article includes information translated from the German and French Wikipedias.

External links

Dormice
Rodents of Europe
Mammals described in 1766
Taxa named by Carl Linnaeus